The Dodge Ram van (also known as the Dodge B-series) is a range of full-size vans that were produced by Chrysler Corporation from the 1971 to 2003 model years.  Replacing the Dodge A100, the Ram Van transitioned to a front-engine drivetrain configuration.  Offered as a cargo van and a passenger van, the model line was initially offered as a cutaway van chassis. 

The B-series van line was produced across 32 years of production, making it among the longest-lived platform designs in American automotive history.  Much of the exterior and chassis underpinnings saw only gradual changes during their entire production, with three distinct generations developed.  Alongside its use by Dodge, the full-size van range saw rebranding during the 1970s for both Fargo Trucks and Plymouth (marking the debut of the Plymouth Voyager nameplate).   

For its entire production run, Chrysler produced B-platform vans at the now-demolished Pillette Road Truck Assembly plant in Windsor, Ontario, Canada; prior to 1980, the model line was produced at Saint Louis North Assembly (Fenton, Missouri).  In 2003, the Dodge Sprinter (a rebranding of its Mercedes-Benz namesake) was introduced, replacing the B-series van entirely from 2004 to 2006.  Since 2014, the Ram division offers the ProMaster to the full-size van market, a rebranded Fiat Ducato.

Model overview
Built on the B platform (later AB), the Dodge full-size vans entered production for the 1971 model year.  Using a one-welded-piece "Uniframe" design, the platform was lighter and stronger, giving a lower cargo floor than previous American designs.  While at the expense of noise, vibration, and harshness (NVH), the resulting lower center of gravity improved handling versus competing products with full frames. 

Produced over three distinct generations, the B-series van utilized the majority of body sheetmetal from 1971 to 2003.  Alongside passenger and cargo vans, the model line also served as a basis for cutaway chassis during the 1970s, serving both commercial markets and as a basis for recreational vehicles.  Though popular in the latter market, Chrysler Corporation would end production of that design as a consequence of their late 1970s financial difficulties. 

The relatively limited changes for the model line across its production made the Dodge Ram van popular with fleet buyers, service companies, and upbuilders because of the compatibility of components across various model years.

In two size extremes to the market segment, Dodge was the first American manufacturer to popularize extended-length passenger vans, with the 1971 "Maxiwagon" introducing 15-passenger seating.   Conversely, the Ram van was the final full-size short-wheelbase van, as the 109-inch wheelbase B1500 was offered through 2003.

First generation (1971-1978)

From 1971 to 1978, Dodge produced two models of the B-series van: the Dodge Tradesman cargo van and the Dodge Sportsman passenger van.  In line with the D-series pickup truck (which underwent a final redesign for 1972), the van was marketed three payload series: ½-ton "100",  ¾-ton "200", and 1-ton "300".  Only five inches longer than its A100/A108 predecessor, moving the front axle forward allowed for a substantial increase in interior space.

Dodge introduced the Tradesman and Sportsman in two wheelbases: 109 inches and 127 inches.  Initially introduced in two body lengths, an extended-length "Maxivan/Maxiwagon" variant was introduced during 1971.  Consisting of an 18-inch rear body extension, the Sportsman Maxiwagon could be fitted with four rows of rear seats, allowing for up to 15 passengers.  While the Tradesman was offered strictly as a cargo van, the Sportsman was offered in three distinct trims: Sportsman, Custom Sportsman, and Royal Sportsman, with the latter rivaling the Dodge Royal Monaco station wagon in equipment and trim.     

Along with its highly sloped hoodline and short front fenders, this generation of the B-series van is distinguished by several exterior design features.  On passenger vans with the 127-inch wheelbase, the front passenger door and the rear side doors are separated by a filler panel (with a small window), with all body lengths (including the Maxiwagon) sharing the same side glass.  The side windows are smaller in size, sharing a beltline with the front door glass.    

Sharing its powertrain with the Dodge D-series pickup truck (redesigned for 1972), the van line was initially released with a 198 cubic-inch Slant-6 along with a 225 cubic-inch Slant-6 and a 318 cubic-inch V8.  For 1972, the 198 was dropped with a 360 V8 becoming a second optional V8.  For 1976, B200 and B300 vans gained the option of large-block 400 and 440 cubic-inch V8s.  A three-speed manual was standard, with the options of a 4-speed manual (added in 1976) and a 3-speed automatic.   

During its production, the first-generation vans saw gradual changes added each year.  For 1972, front disc brakes were added along with full chrome door handles (replacing black push buttons).  For 1973, electronic ignition replaced the previous points-type system and power brakes became standard.  For 1974, a redesigned plastic grille was added (moving the Dodge lettering to the hood).  To better match its Ford and GM competitors, the model line received a sliding door; initially offered on Maxivans/Maxiwagons, the configuration later became an option for the entire model line.  For 1975, an optional single-piece rear door became an option for Sportsman vans; the side-opening door remained unique to the B-series line through the end of its production.  1976 saw the launch of the Street Van customization package for Tradesman vans (see below), with minor interior revisions; in 1977, the single-panel rear door became standard on all Sportsman vans.

For 1978, the B-series van began a two-year transition towards its second generation.  Much of the body behind of the rear doors was revised, deleting the filler panel of long-wheelbase vans; the side and rear windows now extended slightly below the beltline of the front doors.  The interior underwent a major revision with an all-new dashboard, trim, and seats; upgraded interior controls were now shared with Chrysler cars.  In another revision, smaller engine covers increased space for front-seat passengers.  The extended-length Maxivan/Maxivan was now a 26-inch extension, with the Maxiwagon receiving wraparound corner windows to improve visibility.

Rebranding

During the last two years of its existence, Fargo offered a rebadged variant of the Tradesman and Sportsman in Canada for 1971 and 1972 only. Plymouth also received a rebadged variant of the Sportsman, called the Voyager for the 1974 model year. While never as popular as the Dodge version, Plymouth marketed the Voyager in this format through 1983, after which the nameplate was transferred to the new minivan that was introduced for 1984 as a rebadged Dodge Caravan.

Second generation (1979-1997)

For 1979, Dodge completed the two-year transition to its second-generation B-series vans.  The front fascia received a raised hoodline; higher trim Sportsman vans adopted four rectangular headlamps while lower-trim versions and Tradesman cargo vans were fitted with dual round headlamps.  Wrapping into the front fenders, a taller grille was styled in line with the D-series Ram pickup trucks.  In a change that would prove beneficial to Chrysler, the government reclassified the Sportsman passenger van as a truck (instead of a passenger car), with the company better able to meet CAFE implementation.  Sharing the rear body introduced in 1978, the second-generation B-series carried over much of the chassis underpinnings of the first-generation vans. 

After 1980, production ended at Saint Louis North Assembly (retooled to produce the Chrysler K cars), with all production subsequently sourced from Pillette Road Truck Assembly.

Model changes 

For 1980, the windows were revised, with sliding side doors receiving a single-pane window (in line with the single-panel rear door).   For 1981, the B-series van underwent a major rebranding, as Dodge retired the Tradesman and Sportsman nameplates in favor of Dodge Ram Van/Wagon; the B-series nomenclature was revised to B150/B250/B350.  Derived from the B150, the Mini-Ram was a higher-trim passenger van with a larger fuel tank. 

Through the 1980s, the model line underwent relatively few changes.  The introduction of the Chrysler minivans marked the retirement of the Dodge Mini Ram Van and Plymouth Voyager for 1984, as both nameplates were adopted by the minivan line.  For 1986, the grille and badging trim were revised in line with Ram pickup trucks.  In a safety upgrade, outboard seating positions received 3-point seatbelts for 1992.  

For 1994, the model line underwent its most substantial revision since 1978.  Distinguished by new front sheetmetal (adopting a grille styled in line with the redesigned Dodge Ram pickup trucks), the body shell underwent structural enhancements to improve crash protection.  To modernize its appearance, the chrome window trim and chrome door handles were deleted, with brightwork limited to the bumpers and grille.  In a branding change, the van line adopted the nomenclature of the pickup trucks, becoming the B1500/B2500/B3500.  While the dashboard introduced for 1978 remained carryover, the interior saw revisions to the door panels and seats.  In a branding change, the van line adopted the nomenclature of the pickup trucks, becoming the B1500/B2500/B3500.  For 1995, a driver-side airbag was added to the model line.

Powertrain details 
For the second-generation Ram vans, several changes were made to the powertrain line.  After the 1978 model year, Chrysler retired its big-block 400 and 440 V8s for all its vehicles, leaving the 360 V8 as the largest engine offering for the continued production of the model line.   The long-running 3.7L (225) Slant-Six was retired in 1988, with a 3.9L V6 replacing it as the standard engine offering; shared with the Dodge Dakota, the V6 was effectively ¾ of the 5.9L V8.  The same year, the 5.2L V8 adopted fuel injection, with the 5.9L V8 doing so for 1989.  For 1992, Dodge introduced "Magnum"-generation engines, as the 3.9L and 5.2L engines adopted multiport fuel injection (the 5.9L V8 followed suit for 1993).  

For 1980, the 3-speed manual was retired in favor of the overdrive-equipped 4-speed; in 1988, a 5-speed manual was the standard transmission with the 3.9L engine.  A 4-speed automatic became optional during 1988 for the V6 and 5.2L engine, with a heavy-duty 4-speed automatic for the 5.9L V8 added in 1990.  As part of the 1994 model revision, manual transmissions were discontinued, with Dodge becoming the final full-size van to standardize automatic transmissions.

CNG powertrain 
In 1991, Chrysler began development of a CNG-fueled version of the Ram Van, using the 5.2L V8.  After a short initial prototype production, the variant was launched into larger-scale production for 1992; approximately 2,000 were produced primarily for fleet sale.  From 1994 onward, Chrysler continued development with CNG powertrains using the Dodge Caravan.

Third generation (1998-2003)

For 1998, the Dodge B-series van entered its third generation following its most substantial redesign since its 1971 release.  To improve crash protection, the powertrain was moved further forward in the chassis; requiring a longer hood and front fenders (the wheelbase remained carryover).  To further upgrade safety, the bodyshell underwent further reinforcement. 

As a result of moving the powertrain forward, the interior underwent its first major redesign since 1978.  The engine access cover was reduced in size, adding space between the front seats and for both passengers.  The dashboard was redesigned, allowing for the introduction of dual airbags and shared componentry with contemporary Chrysler vehicles.  Redesigned front doors marked the deletion of front vent windows, relocating the sideview mirrors in their place (shared with the Dodge Ram/Dodge Dakota, bringing power-operated mirrors for the first time).  To free up interior cargo space, the spare tire was moved from the interior to an underfloor location.  

Through its production, the third-generation van saw few functional changes following its 1998 introduction.  Carrying over the 3.9L V6, 5.2L V8, and 5.9L V8 from the 1994 model revision, a 3-speed automatic was paired with the V6 and a 4-speed automatic was paired with the V8 engines.

Variants

Street van 

Dodge vans, particularly Tradesman vans from the 1971–1977 model years, were very popular as the basis for many custom vans during the custom van craze that occurred during the mid- to late 1970s and early 1980s. Dodge capitalized on this craze, creating a factory customization package called the "Street Van" package. 

This was advertised alongside the Lil' Red Express and Warlock trucks as "Adult Toys". The Street Van package consisted of a "Street Van" logo on the passenger and driver's side door in lieu of the Tradesman logos, chrome trim on the grille and windshield, simulated wood grain inlays in the steering wheel horn cover and passenger side glare shield, five-slot chrome wheels or white spoked "off-road" type wheels, chrome front and rear bumpers, chrome trim on the gauges, smaller chrome side-view mirrors, patterns and plans to create custom interiors, and membership in the "Dodge Van Clan".  

From 1976 through 1977 years only,You could order a YH3 Street Van with a single driver seat,no dash pad, plain steering wheel and Street Van door decal delete. The decals were placed in the glovebox at time of manufacture. Most of these were sent to conversion companies to be customized to customer specification  This package was available from the 1976 model year until it was discontinued in the early 1980s. This was not an overly popular option from the factory, and Street Vans are somewhat rare. The chrome metal Street Van emblems found on later Street Vans (emblems through mid-1978 were stickers) in good shape are quite valuable to collectors or restorers.

Kary van

For 1973, Dodge introduced the Kary Van variant of the B-series.  A factory-produced cutaway van fitted with a cube van rear body, the Kary Van was produced in 10 and 12-foot lengths and two widths (derived from single or dual rear-wheel axle configuration).

Derived from the B300 Tradesman, the cutaway body of the Kary Van would also serve as a basis underpinning bodies for Type C recreational vehicles during the 1970s.  In 1979, Chrysler ended production of the variant in response to its financial difficulties.

Dodge 50 series 

The Dodge 50 series is a light commercial vehicle that was built by Chrysler Europe (and later Renault Trucks) from 1979 to 1993.  Using the cab assembly of the 1971-1978 Dodge Kary Van, the Dodge 50 mated the American-designed cab with a British-designed chassis.  The model line was powered by Peugeot/Renault gasoline engines and Perkins 4-cylinder diesel engines. 

Following the collapse of Chrysler Europe, the model line continued to be manufactured by Renault, which phased out the Dodge branding entirely after 1987.  After 1993, Renault phased out the model line in favor of its own Renault Master.

Nameplate revival 

In 2012, the Chrysler Ram brand revived the Tradesman nameplate as the Dodge Grand Caravan C/V cargo van was rebranded as the Ram C/V Tradesman.  Sold only as a two-passenger cargo van, the Tradesman replaced the rear side windows with metal panels and was fitted with a flat rear load floor.  After 2015, the Ram ProMaster City (based on the  Fiat Doblò) replaced the C/V Tradesman.

See also
 Dodge A100
 Dodge Ram C/V
 Ford E-Series
 General Motors van
 Ram ProMaster

References

External links

 B-Vans at Allpar, 1970–2007
 Internet Movie Cars Database Entry

Ram van
Rear-wheel-drive vehicles
School bus chassis
Vans
Cars introduced in 1971
1970s cars
1980s cars
1990s cars
2000s cars